Naphius is a genus of dirt-colored seed bugs in the family Rhyparochromidae. There are about seven described species in Naphius.

Species
These seven species belong to the genus Naphius:
 Naphius apicalis (Dallas, 1852)
 Naphius equatorius Scudder, 1969
 Naphius erosus (Distant, 1901)
 Naphius rossi Scudder, 1971
 Naphius schultzei (Breddin, 1913)
 Naphius scorteccii (Mancini, 1964)
 Naphius zavattarii (Mancini, 1948)

References

External links

 

Rhyparochromidae